The Roman Catholic Diocese of Ambatondrazaka is a diocese located in the city of Ambatondrazaka, Madagascar, in the Ecclesiastical province of the Roman Catholic Archdiocese of Toamasina (in Toamasina, Madagascar).

History
 May 21, 1959: Established as Diocese of Ambatondrazaka from the Metropolitan Archdiocese of Diégo-Suarez and Metropolitan Archdiocese of Tananarive

Bishops
 Bishops of Ambatondrazaka (Roman rite)
 Bishop François Vòllaro, O.SS.T. (1959.12.19 – 1993.03.06)
 Bishop Antoine Scopelliti, O.SS.T. (1993.03.06 - 2015.04.11)
 Bishop Jean de Dieu Raoelison (since 2015.04.11)

Coadjutor Bishop
Antoine Scopelliti, O.SS.T. (1991-1993)

Auxiliary Bishop
Gaetano Di Pierro, S.C.I. (2001-2006), appointed Bishop of Moramanga

See also
Roman Catholicism in Madagascar
List of Roman Catholic dioceses in Madagascar

References

Sources
 GCatholic.org
 Catholic Hierarchy

Roman Catholic dioceses in Madagascar
Christian organizations established in 1959
Roman Catholic dioceses and prelatures established in the 20th century
1959 establishments in Madagascar
Roman Catholic Ecclesiastical Province of Toamasina